The Page from the Dalmasse Hotel (German: Der Page vom Dalmasse Hotel) is a 1933 German comedy film directed by Victor Janson and starring Dolly Haas, Harry Liedtke and Hans Junkermann. The art direction was by Fritz Maurischat and Hans Minzloff. The film is based on the novel of the same title by Maria von Peteani.

Cast

References

Bibliography
 Hake, Sabine. German National Cinema. Routledge, 2008.

External links

1933 films
1933 comedy films
German comedy films
Films of the Weimar Republic
1930s German-language films
Films directed by Victor Janson
Films based on Austrian novels
Films set in hotels
Cross-dressing in film
Terra Film films
German black-and-white films
Films scored by Eduard Künneke
1930s German films